"Telling Lies" is a song by English singer-songwriter and actor David Bowie, written and released for downloading and as a single in 1996 and later included on his 21st studio album, Earthling (1997). The song was initially an Internet-only release, and was the first-ever downloadable single by a major artist. No music video was produced for the song.

Three versions of "Telling Lies" were released on Bowie's official website beginning 11 September 1996 one version for each of three weeks. According to issued press releases, over 300,000 people downloaded the original release. Two months later, it was released as a single by BMG.

Background 
Bowie launched the single with an online chat session, where he and two other people pretending to be him answered questions from the audience (Bowie told the truth; the other two "told lies"). The chat audience was asked to vote on which chat personality was the "real" Bowie; according to a transcript of the chat session, the "real" Bowie came in first, although a contemporary source claimed he ended up coming in third.

Critical reception 
Larry Flick from Billboard noted that the song "shows the venerable artist cast within vigorous jungle environment crafted by A Guy Called Gerald." He added, "Start sprinting to your trusty import shop now." Alan Jones from Music Week wrote, "Bowie's vocals are somewhere between spoken and sung over a rhythm-heavy and unsettling track that lapses into jungle rhythms. It will certainly make his Seventies fans look askance, though the hipper young things about town will embrace it." James Hyman from the RM Dance Update rated it four out of five, adding, "Assured via the media that this would be available as 'internet only' despite the fact that limited copies were sent to selected record shops (I picked mine up from Camden's Record & Tape Exchange!), this drum & bass double-pack will excite. A Guy Called Gerald hits hard with Bowie's occasionally stretched vocoded vocals resting firmly over thrashing breakbeat. Adam F works a full vocal into his inimitable freestyle 'jungle jazz'. Finally, Bowie himself provides a more grating mix with an aggressive pace."

Track listing 
 "Telling Lies" (Feelgood mix by Mark Plati) – 5:07
 "Telling Lies" (Paradox mix by A Guy Called Gerald) – 5:10
 "Telling Lies" (Adam F mix) – 3:58

A limited edition CD with a different cover was released with the same tracks. There is also a double 12" vinyl promo release which includes the three mixes of which the A Guy Called Gerald mix appears twice.

Personnel 
 David Bowie – vocals, guitar, saxophone, samples, keyboards, production
 Reeves Gabrels – programming, synthesizers, real and sampled guitars, vocals
 Mark Plati – programming, loops, samples, keyboards
 Gail Ann Dorsey – bass, vocals
 Zachary Alford – drum loops, acoustic drums, electronic percussion
 Mike Garson – keyboards, piano

Charts

Live versions 
 A version recorded at Paradiso, Amsterdam, Holland on 10 June 1997, was released on LiveAndWell.com in 2000.

Other releases 
 The "Adam F mix" was released as a bonus track on the Japanese release of Earthling. It was also released on a UK limited release of the single "Little Wonder" in January 1997.
 The "Paradox mix" was released on the UK 12" release of the single "Dead Man Walking" in April 1997. This mix also appeared on the bonus disc of the LiveAndWell.com album in 2000.
 The "Feelgood mix" and "Paradox mix" were released on the bonus disc of the Digibook Expanded Edition of Earthling in 2004.

References 

1996 songs
David Bowie songs
1996 singles
Songs written by David Bowie
Song recordings produced by David Bowie
Arista Records singles